The Greene Inn (also known as Green Inn or Greene's Inn) was a historic summer resort hotel at 175 Ocean Road in Narragansett, Rhode Island.

The shingle style inn was built in 1887 to a design by William Gibbons Preston and added to the National Register of Historic Places in 1976.  It was designed as a year-round facility in what was then a seasonal summer resort area, with steam heat piped to its rooms.  It originally including facilities for stabling up to 100 polo ponies.

The hotel closed in 1975. The inn was used as a set for the television film The House of Mirth in 1979. It was destroyed by a fire in 1980, and condemned in 1981.

See also
National Register of Historic Places listings in Washington County, Rhode Island

References

Hotel buildings on the National Register of Historic Places in Rhode Island
Shingle Style architecture in Rhode Island
Buildings and structures in Narragansett, Rhode Island
Hotels in Rhode Island
Defunct hotels in the United States
Hotels established in 1887
1980 fires in the United States
Demolished buildings and structures in Rhode Island
National Register of Historic Places in Washington County, Rhode Island
Buildings and structures demolished in 1981
Hotels disestablished in 1975
1975 disestablishments in Rhode Island